These are the results of the Cycling at the 2021 Islamic Solidarity Games which took place between 5 and 13 August 2022 in Konya, Turkey.

Road

Men

Road race
13 August

Individual time trial
11 August

Women

Road race
13 August

Individual time trial
11 August

Track

Men

Individual pursuit
6 August

Points race
7 August

Scratch
5 August

Omnium
8 August

Women

Individual pursuit
6 August

Points race
7 August

Scratch
5 August

Omnium
8 August

References

External links 
Official website

2021 Islamic Solidarity Games